Cunning Single Lady (lit. "Devious Woman Who's Single Again") is a 2014 South Korean romantic comedy television series starring Lee Min-jung and Joo Sang-wook as a divorced couple who rekindles their romance. It aired on MBC from February 27 to April 24, 2014 on Wednesdays and Thursdays at 21:55 for 16 episodes.

Plot
Na Ae-ra grew up believing she was born to be only pretty and not smart. While working at her family's restaurant, she falls in love with Cha Jung-woo, a geeky engineering graduate student preparing to enter civil service. Na Ae-ra wants to become a housewife, and after Jung-woo promises that she will be, they get married. During their 100th day wedding celebration, Jung-woo announces that he has quit his job because he has an idea for a business. Jung-woo's businesses keep failing and Ae-ra struggles to keep them afloat by working multiple jobs. After secretly suffering a miscarriage from the stress of being the sole breadwinner and living in poverty, Ae-ra divorces Jung-woo after four years of marriage. Three years after the divorce, Ae-ra discovers that Jung-woo has become fabulously successful and wealthy, while she is still paying debts that accrued during their marriage. The fun begins when Ae-ra schemes for revenge, with Jung-woo believing that Ae-ra wants him back because he has become wealthy.

Cast

Main characters
Lee Min-jung as Na Ae-ra 
Beautiful but flighty, Ae-ra initially cares more about honing her looks over her life skills. Upon marriage to Jung-woo, she dreams of becoming a housewife but finds herself shouldering the sole burden of their financial needs for four years, until frustration and exhaustion drives her to divorce him. But after learning of his success, she schemes to ostensibly win back her ex-husband by becoming an intern at his company, though what she really wants from him is a belated apology and a "thank you".

Joo Sang-wook as Cha Jung-woo
Despite being an engineering genius, he was initially studying to become a civil servant when he meets and marries Ae-ra. To her shock, Jung-woo suddenly announces that he's quitting to become a software developer instead. Years of his business failures lead to their divorce. Jung-woo eventually creates DonTalk, a WhatsApp-like text-over-data app that becomes Korea's No.1 social networking application. Thus Jung-woo transforms from a geeky loser into the self-made, successful president of D&T Software Ventures, a venture capital firm.

Kim Gyu-ri as Gook Yeo-jin 
Smart, elegant, and capable, Yeo-jin possesses a keen insight and determination that can be intimidating, particularly given that she was born with the disposition of a boss. She is an heiress, being the daughter of the chairman of D&T Software Ventures, where she works as a director. She nurses painful scars from a past love, but falls for her business partner Jung-woo because of his warm personality, becoming Ae-ra's rival for his heart.

Seo Kang-joon as Gook Seung-hyun
Yeo-jin's younger brother, who was once tutored by Jung-woo when he was in high school. Good-looking, rich, and caring, Seung-hyun is seemingly a perfect guy. Upon his return to Korea from overseas, he gets hired at DonTalk despite his resistance to working a desk job at his father's company; but to avoid preferential treatment, he hides his real identity. Among his fellow interns is Ae-ra, and he becomes attracted to her, notwithstanding their eight-year age difference.

Supporting characters
Kim Myung-soo as Gil Yo-han 
Yo-han was the part-time clerk at the PC bang where Jung-woo practically lived when he was broke, and when he hits it big, he takes the kid along and hires him as his personal secretary. The two have a devoted friendship, particularly since Yo-han was by Jung-woo's side while he was suffering through his divorce.

Hwang Bo-ra as Kang Min-young
Ae-ra's best friend.

Lee Byung-joon as Oh Byung-joon
Managing director, and Chairman Gook's right-hand man.

Choi Cheol-ho as Kim Jung-won
Manager of the mobile shopping team.

Im Ji-eun as Wang Ji-hyun
Team leader of the mobile shopping team.

 Lee Hwa-kyum as Pi Song-hee
Fresh out of university, Song-hee is a new employee at D&T Software Ventures. She pretends to be quiet most of the time but is actually a seductress.

Kim Jae-hwa as Oh Bang-soon
Ae-ra's frenemy.

Lee Jung-gil as Gook Yong-geol
Yeo-jin and Seung-hyun's father. The chairman of D&T Software Ventures.

Kim Yong-hee as Na Soo-cheol
Ae-ra's troublemaker older brother. He escapes to Seoul after a failed business in Vietnam. Soo-cheol only manages to survive with the help of his sister, and he accepts the alimony money from Jung-woo that Ae-ra had already rejected.

Kim Eung-soo as Na Gab-soo
Ae-ra's father.

Kwon Ki-sun as Jang Sook-ja
Ae-ra's mother.

Kim Ye-ryeong as Lee Eun-hwa
Yeo-jin and Seung-hyun's mother.

Kim Ho-young as Jung-woo's father
Byun Eun-young as Jung-woo's mother
--- as Cha Jung-sook
Jung-woo's older sister.

--- as Cha Jung-ran
Jung-woo's younger sister.

Choi Joo-hee as Yeo-jin's secretary
 Kim Bup-rae

Cameo appearances
In Gyo-jin as man no. 1
Lee Jung-eun as salon director
Wang Bit-na as Yeo-jin's college roommate who went on a blind date with Jung-woo (ep. 2)
Oh Na-mi as S-line lady
Kim Sung-kyun as head of IT security (ep. 3)
Ricky Kim as Yeo-jin's first love who died in a car accident soon after they got married (ep. 5)
Choi Eun-kyung as matchmaking MC
Yeom Dong-heon as middle-aged man
Yang Hee-kyung as restaurant ajumma
Lee Jong-soo as Robert Kim
Alice as booking lady (ep. 10)
Kwon Nara as booking lady (ep. 10)
Kim Da-hyun as Kim Chang-soo, CEO of Shilla Hotel (ep. 12-13)
Lee Han-wi as doctor
Choi Kyu-hwan as Kim Chang-gyu

Production 
The screenplay won the Encouragement prize at MBC's 2012 Script Contest (serial section).

Ratings
In the table below, the blue numbers represent the lowest ratings and the red numbers represent the highest ratings. The final two episodes were not aired as originally scheduled due to media coverage on the sinking of the MV Sewol.

Awards and nominations

Original soundtrack

Notes

References

External links
Cunning Single Lady official MBC website 
Cunning Single Lady at MBC Global Media

2014 South Korean television series debuts
2014 South Korean television series endings
MBC TV television dramas
Korean-language television shows
South Korean romantic comedy television series
Television series by IOK Media